Of One Blood may refer to:

Of One Blood (album), an album from Shadows Fall
Of One Blood (novel), a 1902 speculative fiction novel by Pauline Hopkins
Of One Blood (film), 1944 film directed by Spencer Williams
 Of One Blood, a 2006 L.A. Theatre Works production by Andrew White